Ravindra B. Bapat is an Indian mathematician. He is known for the Bapat–Beg theorem.

He obtained B.Sc. from University of Mumbai, M.Stat. from the Indian Statistical Institute, New Delhi and Ph.D. from the University of Illinois at Chicago in 1981.

His research interests include major contributions to matrix inequalities, matrices in graph theory, generalized inverses, and matrix analysis. In addition to the numerous research papers in the reputed journals, Bapat has written books on linear algebra published by Hindustan Book Agency, Springer, and Cambridge University Press. He has served on the editorial boards of Electronic Journal of Linear Algebra, Indian Journal of Pure and Applied Mathematics, Kerala Mathematical Association Bulletin, and Linear and Multilinear Algebra. He is national coordinator for the Mathematics Olympiad and was head of the Indian Statistical Institute, Delhi Centre from 2007-2011.

Awards
 President of the Indian Mathematical Society (2007-2008)
 J.C. Bose fellowship (2009)

Books

References

External links
 Homepage of R.B. Bapat
 

20th-century Indian mathematicians
Living people
1954 births